X. maculata may refer to:

 Xenoplia maculata, a geometer moth
 Xestia maculata, an owlet moth
 Xylomyia maculata, a wood soldier fly